Kentucky Route 859 (KY 859) is a , rural, secondary state highway located entirely in Fayette County in east-central Kentucky. It is locally known as Haley Road, and mainly traverses the eastern portions of the county.

Route description 
KY 859 originates with a junction with U.S. Route 60 (US 60) east of the Lexington area. It provides access to Interstate 64 (I-64) before it ends at an intersection with KY 57 (Briar Hill Road).

Major intersections

References

External links
Kentucky Transportation Cabinet

0859
0859